İmrahor is a village in the Ulukışla district of Niğde Province, Turkey, located near the ruins of the site of ancient Faustinopolis, which lies closer to the nearby village of Başmakçı. Fruit farming is the main source of living and the village is famous with its cherries and apples, but decreasing water resources have recently caused problems, including emigration of the younger generation from the village.

The climate is dry and the vegetation typical of the dry steppes of central Anatolia, summers are hot and dry, winters are cold and it snows. Wheat is grown in the valley.

History
There are burial mounds, höyük and other signs of occupation going back to the Hittites and even earlier. The area was later occupied by Phrygians and Romans.

External links

Villages in Ulukışla District